Marianne Gittos (31 July 1830–24 January 1908) was a New Zealand Wesleyan mission worker, teacher, beekeeper and homemaker. She was born at the Māngungu Mission in Northland, New Zealand on 31 July 1830.

References

1830 births
1908 deaths
New Zealand educators
New Zealand Christians
People from the Northland Region
19th-century New Zealand people